Edward Anthony McCarthy (April 10, 1918 – June 7, 2005) is an American prelate of the Roman Catholic Church.  He served as the second archbishop of the Archdiocese of Miami in Florida from 1977 to 1994.  He previously served as bishop of the Diocese of Phoenix in Arizona from 1969 to 1977 and as an auxiliary bishop of the Archdiocese of Cincinnati in Ohio from 1965 to 1969.

McCarthy was appointed Coadjutor Archbishop of Miami on September 17, 1976, and succeeded Coleman Francis Carroll as archbishop of Miami on July 26, 1977. McCarthy retired as archbishop on November 3, 1994.  He died on June 7, 2005, at the age of 87.

Background
McCarthy was ordained a priest in 1943 within the Archdiocese of Cincinnati, graduating from Saint Gregory Seminary and Mt. Saint Mary Seminary in Norwood, Ohio. His education included a master's degree in Philosophy from the Athenaeum of Ohio. He earned a Doctor of Canon Law degree in 1947 and a Doctor of Sacred Theology degree in 1948 while in Rome, Italy at the Pontifical University of St. Thomas Aquinas. His dissertation was entitled "Epiky: a theoretical study of the virtue of epiky and its use, along with a historical review of the development of the doctrine on this subject". He also has a high school named after him.

During his service within the Diocese of Cincinnati he served as the secretary to two Archbishops, judge in the marriage tribunal and chairman of numerous diocesan committees.

Auxiliary Bishop of Cincinnati 
McCarthy was appointed as an auxiliary bishop of the Archdiocese of Cincinnati by Pope Paul VI on April 21, 1965. He was consecrated on June 15, 1965 with Archbishop Karl Alter serving as principal consecrator.

Bishop of Phoenix 
McCarthy was appointed the first bishop of the newly created Diocese of Phoenix by Paul VI on August 25, 1969. McCarthy was installed on December 2, 1969.

Coadjutor Archbishop and Archbishop of Miami 
On September 17, 1976, Paul VI appointed McCarthy as the coadjutor archbishop of the Archdiocese of Miami due to the failing health of Archbishop Coleman F. Carroll. Upon Archbishop Carroll's death on July 26, 1977, McCarthy automatically succeeded him.  Soon after arriving, he oversaw the construction of a Pastoral Center for the diocese and restructured most senior operational divisions. He established the Office of Lay Ministry, the Office of Evangelization and the Permanent Diaconate program.

In 1980, McCarthy was a key figure in offering support and assistance during the Mariel Boat Lift. A year later, he stood up for the rights of Haitian immigrants who were detained under what would become known as the Wet Foot, Dry Foot policy. In response to these incidents, that same year he  oversaw the opening of the Pierre Toussaint Haitian Catholic Center in Miami. However, he was also picketed by Haitian-born Roman Catholic priest Gérard Jean-Juste, who criticized him for not doing more for Haitian refugees and attributed McCarthy's alleged indifference to racism. As punishment, Jean-Juste was forbidden by his church superiors from performing mass in the area.

In 1984, McCarthy assisted with the transition of the new Diocese of Venice and Diocese of Palm Beach. A year later, he would call for the first ever Archdiocesan Synod. Lasting until 1988, it was seen as a method to revitalize the faithful within the archdiocese.

Pope John Paul II visited Miami in 1987. For the first time, he was forced to halt his public Mass midway due to a massive thunderstorm. Severe lightning caused the liturgy to be suspended due to safety concerns—an event that had never occurred elsewhere during the Pope's travels.  John Paul II completed the offering of the mass inside a trailer, as the crowds dispersed, but only after McCarthy pleaded with them to tend to their own safety.

Retirement and legacy 
In 1993, McCarthy submitted his resignation at the mandatory retirement age of 75. He became officially retired on November 3, 1994.  In his final year, he started the planning of a new parish and high school in western Broward County. The church, founded after his retirement, bore his namesake...Saint Edward. current Archbishop John C. Favalora named it the Archbishop Edward A. McCarthy High School.

Edward A. McCarthy died in his sleep on June 7, 2005, at the age of 87.

References

External links
Archdiocese of Miami
Archbishop Edward A. McCarthy High School

Episcopal succession

1918 births
2005 deaths
Religious leaders from Cincinnati
Roman Catholic Archdiocese of Cincinnati
20th-century Roman Catholic archbishops in the United States
Participants in the Second Vatican Council
Roman Catholic archbishops of Miami
Roman Catholic Ecclesiastical Province of Santa Fe
The Athenaeum of Ohio alumni